The Satin Slipper (Le soulier de satin) is a 1985 Portuguese-French drama film based on the play by Paul Claudel. It was directed by Manoel de Oliveira and screened at the 42nd Venice International Film Festival.

Cast
 Luís Miguel Cintra as Don Rodrigue
 Patricia Barzyk as Dona Prouhèze
 Anne Consigny as Marie des Sept-Épées
 Anne Gautier as Dona Musique
 Bernard Alane as Le vice-roi de Naples
 Jean-Pierre Bernard as Don Camille
 Marie-Christine Barrault as La lune
 Isabelle Weingarten as L'Ange Gardien
 Henri Serre as The First King
 Jean-Yves Berteloot as The Second King
 Catherine Jarret as The Actress

Awards
42nd Venice International Film Festival
Sergio Trasatti Award

References

External links
 

1985 films
French drama films
1980s French-language films
1985 drama films
Films directed by Manoel de Oliveira
Films produced by Paulo Branco
Portuguese drama films
1986 drama films
1986 films
1980s French films